Thường Tín station (Vietnamese: Ga Thường Tín) is a railway station in Thường Tín town, Thường Tín district, Hanoi. It's located near National Route 1 on the North–South railway.

References

Railway stations in Hanoi